Albert Victor Hyzler (20 November 1916 – 26 October 1993) was a Maltese politician.

The son of Professor Giuseppe Hyzler, a physician, and Marietta Muscat Fenech, Albert Hyzler was elected to Parliament in 1947 in the interest of the Democratic Action Party led by his father. He later joined the Labour Party and was elected in every election he contested until 1976 when he retired from politics.  

Hyzler was Cabinet minister between 1955 and 1958, and from 1971 until 1976. He served as the acting president of Malta from 27 December 1981 to 15 February 1982. He was married to Marie Rose Petrocochino.

References

1916 births
1993 deaths
Presidents of Malta
People from Valletta
20th-century Maltese politicians
20th-century Maltese physicians
Labour Party (Malta) politicians
Health ministers of Malta